The Bustan (also transliterated as Būstān, Bustān; "the orchard") is a book of poetry by the Persian poet Saadi, completed in 1257 CE and dedicated to the Salghurid Atabeg Sa'd I or Sa'd II. Bustan is considered one of two major works of Saadi.

It was Saadi's first work. The book contains the fruits of Saadi's long experience and his judgements upon life, and is illustrated by a vast collection of anecdotes. It includes accounts of Saadi's travels and his analysis of human psychology. He often mentions his accounts with fervour and advice similar to Aesop's fables. The book has ten chapters regarding the issues of ethics and training; namely, justice, mercy, love, humility, contentment, devotions, education, gratitude, repentance, and praying.

This book is one of the 100 greatest books of all time according to Bokklubben World Library. It is composed in mathnawī style (rhyming couplets), and has been translated into English. The Bustan was translated into Dutch in 1688 by Daniel Havart.

In India, Bustan and Gulistan were taught to schoolboys in maktabs, and it had to be learnt by heart.

See also 
Lote tree
Persian literature

References

External links 

English translation of Bustan-e Saadi (pdf)

1257 works
13th-century books
Iranian books
Saadi Shirazi
Memory of the World Register in Iran